Make a Wish  is a 2011 British short film directed by Romana Carén, about a trunk with the note "Make a wish" on it. It was screened in the Short Film Corner of the Cannes Film Festival 2011.

Plot
Make a Wish is a dramatic comedy with dark undertones. It's a simple cautionary tale which is symbolic for how thoughts can influence our lives and our responsibility for our deeds. John, the protagonist receives a trunk that has the power to fulfill all of his dreams. Gradually he becomes greedier and greedier. He gets what he wishes for, but he is made to pay the price. What seemed like an ideal world, soon turns into something rather unexpected.

Cast
 Jean-Philippe Heon - John
 Lia McQuiston - Melanie

References

External links
 

2011 films
2011 short films
British silent short films
Films directed by Romana Carén
Silent films in color
2010s English-language films